Charles Mears (March 16, 18141895) was a Michigan lumber businessman, capitalist, merchant, transportation executive, engineer, and farmer. He owned thousands of acres of timber in Michigan, and had 15 sawmills to produce lumber. Mears built cargo boats to transport his lumber to Chicago, and developed several harbors in western Michigan.

A Republican, he was a friend of Abraham Lincoln. Mears had two of his settlements in Michigan renamed Lincoln and Hamlin to honor the successful 1860 Republican presidential ticket. Mears State Park in Pentwater is named after him.

Early life
Mears was the son of Nathan Mears and his wife, Lucy. He was the second-oldest of five children. His grandfather was Thomas Mears, a minuteman in the American Revolutionary War. Mears was born  from Boston in North Billerica, Massachusetts, on March 16, 1814. His mother's family had the Scottish name of Levistone, which was anglicized to Livingston. Mears's father was, from 1821 to 1828, one of the town's leaders. He built and operated a sawmill, owned several farms, and kept a store.

In 1795, ground was broken at Billerica Mills for the Middlesex Canal. Opened in 1802, it was the first canal in the United States; Mears's father owned one of its locks. Charles and his brothers became familiar with canals, their locks, control of water power for dams, and mill machinery because of their father's operations on the Concord River. Mears and his siblings were not allowed to go their own way, which was the New England custom of the time. Mears looked forward to "Training Day" because he could get "a card of gingerbread". He was ambitious, revealing his early entrepreneurial traits, and said that he was willing to "run a mile for a nickel." Mears and his siblings were orphaned after the death of their parents. Guardians were appointed to take care of them, and they were sent to academies to finish their education. Mears went to Hopkinton Academy and Westford Academy for his basic schooling, and to trade school in Lowell, Massachusetts, to learn cabinetmaking. His first jobs were in Lowell, as a schoolteacher and a cabinetmaker.

Adulthood
According to one account, Mears was in the Massachusetts lumber and provision trades in 1835 and 1836. Like most young men in New England at the time, he and his brothers looked to "the West" for new adventures. After their sister married in 1836, the brothers no longer felt obligated to remain in the state. They studied the 1836 John Farmer's Map of Michigan and decided to move to the territory. Farmer’s early maps of Michigan were influential in promoting emigration to the state between 1825 and 1840. Mears and his brothers went to Paw Paw because of the Paw Paw River and its navigational access to Lake Michigan. They decided to start E. & C. Mears and Company, a general-merchandise business in Paw Paw. The brothers had a large, general stock of goods shipped from Detroit in the fall. The steamer carrying the goods was routed through the Straits of Mackinac and then south along Michigan's western coast to St. Joseph and Paw Paw. Their shipment was burgled in Mackinac, however, and much of it was stolen. Despite hardships, the brothers eventually prospered in Paw Paw.

Albert, their youngest brother, joined them in 1837 from the east. The Mears brothers bought and sold anything which the few white settlers and the many Native Americans wanted to trade. Game was plentiful, and large numbers of furs were bought. The company may have also speculated in land and village lots, since county records indicate that they acquired title to land which they later sold. Mears became restless after hearing about locations farther north along the Lake Michigan shore which were better suited for business and lumbering, and was anxious to reach the virgin territory to obtain valuable pine timber in advance of the speculators (who were already arriving in large numbers).

An exploring expedition was planned by Mears and his older brother, and a small boat was built to navigate Lake Michigan and the rivers flowing north into it; sixteen-year-old Albert was also eager to go. Two other men were added to the party: Charles Herrick and Benjamin True (or Trew). On or about May 8, 1837, they left Paw Paw and went as far north as Manistee. Into 1838, they scouted a number of areas for potential lumber mills along the west Lake Michigan shoreline. They returned south, settled initially in an area now known as Whitehall, and were the first white settlers in that west Michigan area.

West Michigan development

Mears had a hand in developing many of the towns on Michigan's west coast; he owned thousands of acres of timber land, and needed to transport the lumber from his sawmills to Chicago. He developed a number of harbors in west Michigan towns to transport his lumber. Mears built (or had built) sailboats; one, a sloop named the Ranger, carried 15,000 board feet of lumber per trip to Chicago. Another of his vessels, of similar size, was the schooner E. M. Peck. He built and operated sawmills to make his own lumber.

Mears looked for new sites for settlement, and selected potential sites on the eastern shoreline of Lake Michigan. He investigated the tributary streams running from an inland lake to Lake Michigan, intending to develop harbors where his boats could load and unload cargo. Mears then purchased thousands of acres of land through the government land office in Ionia, Michigan. He built a temporary dam, had a company of men dig a channel for water, and released the dammed water. The water rushed through the new channel, digging it deeper in the process. Mears then built slab piers into Lake Michigan to protect the newly-constructed harbor. A sawmill would be erected alongside the new harbor channel, with other buildings built which were necessary for a lumber camp. The place for lumberjacks to live became a community and then an organized village in time. Mears opened six harbors on Lake Michigan, and built 15 sawmills associated with these places that became villages.

Whitehall
Mears built his first lumber mill on Thompson Creek at White Lake in 1838. Powered by water, it cut shingles and clapboard at first. A gate saw for producing larger lumber was added to the mill soon afterwards. Mears had another water mill built by John Baptiste Lemieux in 1848 on Duck Lake, about four miles from Whitehall. Usually assisted by Herrick, he sawed a cargo load; they would then shut down the mill and go to Chicago or Milwaukee to sell the lumber.

Mears platted the village of Whitehall with Giles B. Slocum around 1859. Originally named Mears, its post office was renamed Whitehall in 1867 because of the village's association with nearby White Lake. The town prospered because of its favorable location for shipping lumber to Lake Michigan.

Pentwater
Mears dug a wider channel for the Pentwater River to flow into Lake Michigan, meandering through sand dunes. He built a sawmill on its north bank in 1855 to manufacture and haul lumber to his yards in Chicago. Soon afterward, Mears built a store and boarding house for the sawmill labor he needed. He built a tile and brick factory in the area after discovering a clay deposit there. Mears first called the community Middlesex, and it was renamed Pentwater when the village was formed in 1867. The Mears State Park land was given to the state of Michigan at the 1957 death of his daughter Carrie, and it is named after him.

Ludington

Mears built sawmills in the Ludington area, in settlements which were known as Little Sable (1851) and Big Sable (1859). He later renamed them Lincoln and Hamlin in 1861, in honor of the successful Republican Presidential ticket. The village of Hamlin lies under ruins in Ludington State Park and the village of Lincoln lies under the greens of the Lincoln Hills Golf Club in Ludington.

Personal life 
A member of the Republican Party, Mears served in the Michigan Senate. He was a friend of Abraham Lincoln, and had the town in which he lived (near Ludington) renamed "Lincoln". Mears had the Mason County courthouse moved from Burr Caswell's farmhouse to Lincoln in 1861, and to the first building built as a courthouse in Mason County. The county seat moved to Ludington in 1873, when Mears built sawmills in the area. He was elected a Michigan senator in the 1860 election. One of his first acts as senator was to have the Mason County seat moved to his town, Black Creek (later known as Little Sable, and then Lincoln). Mears devoted much attention to an 1863 river and harbor bill and an omnibus swampland bill, both of which ultimately were approved by voters and passed.

Because of his activities in the northern United States (especially in Michigan and Illinois) as an industrialist, merchant, transportation executive, engineer, farmer and politician, he was called a "Yankee of the Yankees" by a Chicago historian. As an employer, Mears was known as a kindly man willing to help an employee in need who paid a fair wage; in return, however, he expected his employees to work nonstop from at least sunrise to sunset. Mears was given the title "Christopher Columbus of the West Coast" by a group of historians who worked for the state of Michigan.

He established his Michigan home in 1871, in a large house which he called "The White House", between Whitehall and Ludington on the shore road between Muskegon and Traverse City. Mears' housekeeper was Caroline Middleton, widow of William Middleton (one of his boat captains). Middleton had two young daughters (Carrie Adelia and Ellen Jane), and Mears took an interest in the family's welfare after the captain's death. In late 1873, romance blossomed between the 59-year-old bachelor Mears and 23-year-old Carrie Adelia Middleton; they were married at Mears' house on January 20, 1874.

The couple had two daughters: Carrie Ellen (born in 1880) and Ludy Livingston (born in 1883). Mears retired from the lumber business in 1883, and the family moved to a mansion at 345 Ohio Street in Chicago. Ludy died at age 13 in 1897, and Carrie died at her home in Pentwater in 1957. Mears died in 1895; his wife had died the previous year. His daughter, Carrie, preserved his memory by preserving his papers, letters and diaries. The Chicago-related memorabilia is preserved at the Chicago History Museum, and the Michigan memorabilia is part of the Michigan Historical Collections at the University of Michigan.

Chicago residence

References

Notes

Bibliography

1814 births
1895 deaths
People from Billerica, Massachusetts
Businesspeople from Chicago
People from Oceana County, Michigan
People of the Michigan Territory
Michigan state senators
19th-century American politicians
People from Whitehall, Michigan
People from Paw Paw, Michigan
19th-century American businesspeople